Frederic Carl Reichardt (born March 16, 1943) is a former Major League outfielder for the Los Angeles / California Angels (1964–70), Washington Senators (1970), Chicago White Sox (1971–73) and Kansas City Royals (1973–74).  He batted and threw right-handed.

Reichardt was a spectacular two-sport star at the University of Wisconsin, twice leading the Big Ten Conference in batting,  and starring as a fullback on the 1962 #2 ranked Badgers Rose Bowl team, which was defeated in the 1963 Rose Bowl by #1 ranked USC in the "comeback that never was" where the Badgers scored 23 points in the last 12 minutes, but still lost by 5 points (42 to 37). His football playing career never went beyond being selected by the Baltimore Colts in the 17th round (238th overall) of the 1965 NFL Draft.

His athletic prowess was highly rated by all Major League Baseball scouts, and when a bidding war ensued for his signing, he received a $200,000 ($ today) signing bonus from the Los Angeles Angels, a record for that time. It was the bidding war for Reichardt that ultimately led Major League Baseball to institute a draft, which started in 1965, with Rick Monday being the first ever #1 overall selection (he was drafted by the Kansas City Athletics).

In 1966, Reichardt became the first player to hit a home run at Anaheim Stadium.  Later that season, after batting .288 with 16 home runs and 44 RBI through just 89 games, he was diagnosed with a kidney ailment that necessitated the removal of the kidney. Although he recovered to hit .265 with 17 home runs in 1967, and .255 with 21 home runs in 1968, he was never quite the same after the operation. After hitting only 13 home runs in 1969, he was traded with Aurelio Rodríguez to the Washington Senators early in the 1970 season for 3rd baseman Ken McMullen. After a trade to the White Sox in 1971, he managed to hit .278 with 19 homers.  From there, age and injuries took their toll and he never again attained double figures in home runs in a season. He retired after 1 at-bat in the 1974 season.

References

External links

1943 births
Living people
Sportspeople from Madison, Wisconsin
Baseball players from Wisconsin
Wisconsin Badgers baseball players
All-American college baseball players
National College Baseball Hall of Fame inductees
Major League Baseball left fielders
Hawaii Islanders players
Los Angeles Angels players
California Angels players
Washington Senators (1961–1971) players
Chicago White Sox players
Kansas City Royals players
Players of American football from Wisconsin
American football fullbacks
Wisconsin Badgers football players